Carla Matadinho (born 16 December 1982 in Évora) is a Portuguese model.

Matadinho is one of the most famous Portuguese models, after her start at 15 with Miss Sporting. She then was crowned Miss Concelhos de Portugal and Miss Alentejo at 16. At 19, she became the first Miss Playboy from Portugal. She has also finished the Miss Portugal and Miss Figueira da Foz courses.

Matadinho has worked in many publicity works from Levi's to Triumph, from Fátima Lopes passerelle to Maxmen (Maxim magazine in Portugal) magazine covers.

She has brown eyes, blond hair and white skin.

External links
 Official website

1982 births
Portuguese female models
Living people
People from Évora